The 1914 Colorado Agricultural Aggies football team represented Colorado Agricultural College (now known as Colorado State University) in the Rocky Mountain Conference (RMC) during the 1914 college football season.  In their fourth season under head coach Harry W. Hughes, the Aggies compiled a 3–4 record and outscored all opponents by a total of 127 to 106.

Schedule

References

Colorado Agricultural
Colorado State Rams football seasons
Colorado Agricultural Aggies football